Krystyna Kuhn (born 1960, in Würzburg) is a German writer, best known for her crime-thriller book series Das Tal Season (2010–2013) and Monday Club (2015–2016).

References 

1960 births
Living people
German crime fiction writers
People from Würzburg